Ivan Dmitrievich Vasilenko (January 20, 1895 – May 26, 1966), was a Soviet writer of children's books.

Early years

Ivan Dmitrievich Vasilenko was born January 20, 1895, in the village of Makiivka, in Don Host Oblast (in present-day Donetsk Oblast, Ukraine) in a clerk’s family. Seven years later, his family moved to the city of Taganrog proper. In 1912 Ivan Vasilenko graduated from the 4-year college and became teacher at a village school. He entered the Belgorod pedagogical institute, but was soon dismissed for organization of  a Marxist group, because of that the further route for Vasilenko to teaching was closed and he worked as an accountant in the Taganrog Land bank. After October Revolution, he managed trade department, later the department of public education, and gave lessons. During World War II, he contributed to Soviet military newspapers.

The literary career of Ivan Vasilenko 

The literary talent of Vasilenko was discovered by Russian writer Vikenty Veresaev in 1937. All of his tales and stories written for 30 years of creative life, such as Magic Box, Childhood of the Actor, The Little Mouse, The Gordian Knot, Cocks, Green Trunk, Golden Shoes, Sunrise is only Once a Day, Merimes Watch, Family Council, Misha and Masha and others, were reissued by local, republican and central publishing houses and used large popularity both for children and for adults. 

In 1949, Vasilenko was awarded a State Stalin Prize for the story "The Little Star" about life of trade school’s students. Many books have been translated into 27 languages of USSR nations, and into Czech, German, Polish, Bulgarian, Romanian, Vietnamese, French and English languages. His works The Little Star, Artyomka in the Circus, Magic Box, Golden Shoes were filmed and released as motion pictures.

He died in Taganrog on May 26, 1966.

Remembrance
 Memorial museum was inaugurated in the house on Ulitsa Chekhova 88 in Taganrog, where Ivan Vasilenko and his family lived from 1923 until 1966.
 One of Taganrog Public Chekhov Library's branches is named after Vasilenko. 
 In May 2010 a monument "Artyomka" was inaugurated in front of the memorial museum on Chekhov Street.

Works

 Magic Box («Ростиздат», Ростов, 1938)
Magic Box («Детгиз», М., 1941).
Life Plan or Little Star («Молодая гвардия», М., 1948).
Amazing Stories («Ростиздат», Ростов, 1946).
My friends (novels and stories) («Сов. писатель», М., 1946).
Actor's Childhood - Artyomka in the Circus («Правда»,М., 1952).
Captain's Order («Детизд», М., 1953).
Magic Box (novels and stories) («Моск. рабочий», М., 1953).
Selected Stories («Сов. писатель», М., 1956).
Golden Shoes («Детизд», М., 1958).
Selected Stories of Children («Детизд», М., 1960).
Novels (Душанбе, 1966)

External links
 Ivan Vasilenko and his home city Taganrog

1895 births
1966 deaths
People from Makiivka
People from Don Host Oblast
Soviet children's writers
Soviet male writers
Stalin Prize winners